Horst M. Rechelbacher (1941 – February 15, 2014) was an  Austrian American businessman who was the founder of the cosmetics company Aveda Corporation and Intelligent Nutrients. His interest in developing products without toxic chemicals launched the market for natural cosmetics in the United States.

Early life and career
Rechelbacher was born in Klagenfurt, Austria to an herbalist and shoe maker/designer, and was the youngest of three brothers. His family apartment overlooked a small salon across the street in central Klagenfurt. During his childhood, Rechelbacher had many opportunities to observe the daily activities of the salon which inspired him to choose a vocation or continue with a formal education in salon profession. At age fourteen, he embarked on a three-year apprenticeship in the beauty and salon industry. During his apprenticeship, he was a three-time winner of the Austrian Junior Championships. At seventeen, he moved to Italy and started work at an exclusive salon in Rome.

In 1970, Rechelbacher went to Florida to participate in a number of different competitions.

In 1978, he founded Aveda and began to expand the product line into hair, skin and body care, makeup, plant-based perfumes (aromatherapy) and lifestyle products.

Following the Exxon Valdez oil spill, Rechelbacher was the first to sign onto the Valdez Principles, now the Ceres principles,  joining corporate environmental responsibility with corporate bottom line.  In 1992, along with his partner Kiran, he attended the Earth Summit, where three key agreements occurred:  the Climate Change Convention, a precursor to the Kyoto Protocol, the Convention on Biological Diversity and an Intellectual Property Rights accord for indigenous peoples that included preventing actions that could be deemed culturally inappropriate and/or cause environmental destruction.  Through this convention, Rechelbacher forged a relationship with the Brazilian Yawanawa tribe and began a project cultivating uruku for its pigment and replanting seedlings in deforested areas.

Nearly two decades after Rechelbacher incorporated, he sold Aveda to the Estee Lauder Companies but remained a consultant until March 2003.

In the years following the sale of Aveda, Horst established Intelligent Nutrients. IN is an organic, food-grade, non-toxic plant-based hair, skin, body, aroma and lifestyle company with the primary emphasis on using organically grown ingredients.

Projects
Rechelbacher was the founder and chairman of the Horst M. Rechelbacher Foundation, a philanthropic organization dedicated to social and environmental preservation projects that operate on a grass-roots level. He also owned HMR Galleries, an art and antiques business, and was involved in producing films including the 1999 film Hidden Medicine.

Personal life
Rechelbacher maintained residences in Minneapolis, Minnesota and New York City.  As well as a private estate and a company retreat, the Osceola, Wisconsin, property serves as an organic farm cultivating flowers and plants while also operating a distillery for the IN products.  The farm and home are solar powered.

Rechelbacher was divorced with two children, a son Peter and a daughter Nicole. Nicole is a married mother of three, and former accessories and clothing designer for Aveda.  Peter is married with a son, and provided expertise in finance, and was president of Intelligent Nutrients while at Aveda.

Horst lived and worked with his long-time companion, wife, and former vice president of marketing and creative for Aveda, Kiran Stordalen.

Rechelbacher died from complications of pancreatic cancer on February 15, 2014, at the age of 72 at his home in Osceola, Wisconsin.

Books
 Rejuvenation: a wellness guide for women and men. Published 1987, Harper & Row.
 Aveda Rituals: a daily guide to natural health and beauty. Published 1999, Henry Holt.
 Minding Your Business: Profits that Restore The Planet. Published 2008, Earth Aware Editions.
 Alivelihood: The Art of Sustainable Success. Published 2006, HMR Publishing.

References

External links
 Aveda Official Website
Intelligent Nutrients: Our Founder (Intelligent Nutrients website)
 "Horst" (Horst Galleries website)

Further reading 

 "Beauty and the Feast," by Mary Tannen. New York Times Magazine, September 15, 2002, page 109.
 "Super Natural," by Mark Sevjar. American Salon, October 2005, page 110.
 "Labors of Love," by Julie Sinclair. American Spa, April 2005, page 26.
 "Reputations: Dowry of earthly harmony," by Sarah Ryle. The Guardian, November 22, 1997. City Page section, page 24.
 "Aveda shops dabble in earthly delights," by Linda Gillian Griffin. Houston Chronicle, August 29, 1996, Fashion section, page 2.
 The Natural Beauty of Aveda: A Discussion with Chris Hacker Enlightened Brand Journal, Autumn 2004. (Explanation of company name.)
 "Go, earth girl!" Teen Magazine November 1995, page 84. (Story about Nicole Rechelbacher.)

American businesspeople
Austrian businesspeople
History of cosmetics
1941 births
2014 deaths
Recipients of the Decoration of Honour for Services to the Republic of Austria
Deaths from pancreatic cancer
People from Klagenfurt
People from Osceola, Wisconsin